S.K. Mother International School is in Muzaffarpur, Bihar. It is affiliated with C.B.S.E. The school has many facilities such as Library, Lab (All), located in the center of the town, a huge field for playing, and the town's first - Cricket School. This school is located in Arya Samaj Parisar, Naya Tola. The Director is one of the oldest faculty of the town. It is a co-educational school and has classes from grade I to XII.

History
S.K. Mother International School was started in 2007 and it is managed by the private unaided. The school imparts education from 1 to 12th grade and is affiliated to the CBSE.

See also

 DAV Sasaram

References

External links
 S.K. Mother International School

International schools in India
Schools in Bihar
Education in Muzaffarpur
Educational institutions established in 2007
2007  establishments in Bihar